California's 4th State Assembly district is one of 80 California State Assembly districts. It is currently represented by Democrat Cecilia Aguiar-Curry of Winters.

District profile 
The district encompasses much of the southern and western Sacramento Valley and Wine Country. The Coast Ranges run down the western half of the district.

Colusa County – 52.4%
 Arbuckle
 Williams

All of Lake County
 Clearlake
 Lakeport

All of Napa County
 American Canyon
 Calistoga
 Napa
 St. Helena
 Yountville

Solano County – 7.3%
 Dixon

Sonoma County – 14.9%
 Boyes Hot Springs
 Rohnert Park

Yolo County – 75.7%
 Davis
 Winters
 Woodland

Election results from statewide races

List of assembly members 
Due to redistricting, the 4th district has been moved around different parts of the state. The current iteration resulted from the 2011 redistricting by the California Citizens Redistricting Commission.

Election results 1992 - present

2020

2018

2016

2014

2012

2011 (special)

2010

2008

2006

2004

2002

2000

1998

1996

1994

1992

See also 
 California State Assembly
 California State Assembly districts
 Districts in California

References

External links 
 District map from the California Citizens Redistricting Commission

04
Government of Colusa County, California
Government of Lake County, California
Government of Napa County, California
Government of Solano County, California
Government of Sonoma County, California
Government of Yolo County, California
Sacramento Valley
Clearlake, California
Davis, California
Lakeport, California
Napa, California
Rohnert Park, California
St. Helena, California
Winters, California
Woodland, California
Yountville, California